2015 Shenzhen Open may refer to:

2015 ATP Shenzhen Open, an ATP World Tour tennis tournament
2015 WTA Shenzhen Open, a WTA Tour tennis tournament

See also
 2015 Shenzhen Open – Doubles
 2015 Shenzhen Open – Singles (disambiguation)